John Burnett (20 December 1925 – 5 November 2006) was a social historian who was a professor at Brunel University between 1972 and 1990. His research examined the day-to-day lives of ordinary British people in the 19th and 20th centuries.

Originally from Nottingham, he studied at High Pavement School, and then read history and law at Emmanuel College, Cambridge, then law at the University of London. He taught at Guildford Technical College and Borough Polytechnic before reading for a PhD in history at the London School of Economics.

The Burnett Archive of Working Class Autobiography, housed at Brunel University and containing over 230 autobiographies, was compiled by Burnett, David Vincent and David Mayall. Burnett, Vincent and Myall co-edited The Autobiography of the Working Class, in three volumes, based on their work on the archive.

Select bibliography
Plenty and Want: Social History of Food in England from 1815 to the Present Day, 1966
A History of the Cost of Living, 1969
Useful Toil: Autobiographies of Working People from the 1820s to the 1920, 1974
Destiny Obscure: Autobiographies of Childhood, Education and Family from the 1820s to the 1920s, 1982
The Autobiography of the Working Class: An Annotated, Critical Bibliography, 1984-9 (three volume collection, co-edited with David Vincent and David Mayall)
A Social History of Housing, 1815-1985, 1986
Idle Hands: Experience of Unemployment, 1790-1990, 1994
The Origins and Development of Food Policies in Europe, 1994 (with Derek Oddy)
Liquid Pleasures: A Social History of Drinks in Modern Britain, 1999
England Eats Out: A Social History of Eating Out in England from 1830 to the Present, 2004

References

Social historians
Food historians
Historians of the United Kingdom
Writers from Nottingham
People educated at Nottingham High Pavement Grammar School
Alumni of Emmanuel College, Cambridge
Alumni of the London School of Economics
Academics of Brunel University London
1925 births
2006 deaths
English male non-fiction writers
20th-century English historians
20th-century English male writers